George W. Anderson may refer to:

George W. Anderson (judge) (1861–1937), American jurist, federal judge from Massachusetts
George Washington Anderson (1832–1902), American lawyer, U.S. congressman for Missouri
George Wayne Anderson Jr. (1839 –  1906), Confederate officer
George Wayne Anderson (politician) (1863–1922), American jurist, Virginia state senator
George Whelan Anderson Jr. (1906–1992), American admiral, Chief of Naval Operations

See also
George Anderson (disambiguation)